Koti Residency or British Residency or "Hyderabad Residency" is an opulent mansion built by James Achilles Kirkpatrick in the princely state of Hyderabad. Kirkpatrick was British Resident of Hyderabad between 1798 and 1805. It is a minor tourist attraction located in the suburb of Koti, Hyderabad.

The building with its classical portico is in the style of a Palladian villa and is similar in design to its near-contemporary in the United States, the White House. It features in the 2002 William Dalrymple book White Mughals. The house was designed by Lieutenant Samuel Russell of the Madras Engineers and construction began in 1803.

History

Kirkpatrick built the mansion for himself and his Indian wife Khair un Nissa, who bore him two surviving children who were sent to England by the age of five and never saw them again due to the early deaths of their parents.

The building was once the embassy of the East India Company to the court of the Nizam of Hyderabad, and the residence of James Kirkpatrick, the British Resident, as well as his successors. Within its compound there were several quarters, including a zenana (women's quarters) where Khair un Nissa lived. Within the compound is a miniature model of the building- legend has it that this was so Kirkpatrick's wife, who remained in purdah, could see the entire mansion, including the front. This scaled model has recently been beautifully restored.

During the Indian Rebellion of 1857, a group of rebels, led by Maulvi Allauddin and Turrebaz Khan, attacked the residency. After the events of 1857, the British erected martello towers at the residency, which were demolished in 1954.

After independence in 1947, the building became vacant. In 1949 it was converted into a women's college, Osmania University College for Women.

After a court directive to the Archaeological Survey of India, it is now a protected monument. However, the building suffered much damage over the years and part of the ceiling had collapsed. Restoration works were completed in January 2023, the result of an effort spanning over 20 years.

List of British Residents 

Major-General William Kirkpatrick (1795–1797) (before the residency was built)
Major James Achilles Kirkpatrick (1797–1805)
Captain Thomas Sydenham (1806–1810)
Sir Henry Russell (1811–1820)
Sir Charles Metcalfe (1820–1825)
Colonel Cuthbert Davidson (1857–1862)
Sir Richard Temple (1867–1868)
C. B. Saunders (1868–1872)
Sir Richard Meade (1875–1881)
John Graham Cordery (1883–1888)
Sir Trevor Chichele Plowden
Michael O'Dwyer (1908–1909)
Colonel Alexander Pinhey (1911–1916)
Sir Stuart Fraser (1916–1919)
Sir Lennox Russell (1919–1925)
Sir Duncan Mackenzie (1935–1938)
Sir Arthur Lothian (1942–1946)

Architecture 
The building is in the Palladian style, with a classical portico. Six Corinthian columns support the roof. Within its compound there were several quarters, including a zenana quarter.

References 

Heritage structures in Hyderabad, India
Hyderabad State
Tourist attractions in Hyderabad, India
Royal residences in India
Residencies of British India
1805 establishments in British India
Palaces in Hyderabad, India
Neoclassical architecture in India